In mathematics, the monkey saddle is the surface defined by the equation 

or in cylindrical coordinates

It belongs to the class of saddle surfaces, and its name derives from the observation that a saddle for a monkey would require two depressions for the legs and one for the tail. The monkey saddle has an isolated umbilical point with zero Gaussian curvature at the origin, while the curvature is strictly negative at all other points.

One can relate the rectangular and cylindrical equations using complex numbers 

By replacing 3 in the cylindrical equation with any integer  one can create a saddle with  depressions.

Another orientation of the monkey saddle is the Smelt petal defined by  so that the z-axis of the monkey saddle corresponds to the direction  in the Smelt petal.

Horse saddle 

The term horse saddle may be used in contrast to monkey saddle, to designate an ordinary saddle surface in which z(x,y) has a saddle point, a local minimum or maximum in every direction of the xy-plane. In contrast, the monkey saddle has a stationary point of inflection in every direction.

References

External links
 

Multivariable calculus
Surfaces